Andrew Richard Cornford (born 8 October 1970) is a former English cricketer.  Cornford was a right-handed batsman who bowled right-arm medium pace.  He was born at Crowborough, Sussex.

Cornford represented the Sussex Cricket Board in 3 List A matches.  These came against the Essex Cricket Board and Wales Minor Counties in the 1st and 2nd rounds of the 2002 Cheltenham & Gloucester Trophy which was held in 2001 and the Worcestershire Cricket Board in the 2nd round of the 2003 Cheltenham & Gloucester Trophy which was held in 2002.  In his 3 List A matches, he scored 9 runs at a batting average of 4.50, with a high score of 9.  In the field he took 3 catches.  With the ball he took 6 wickets at a bowling average of 19.50, with best figures of 3/38.

References

External links
Andrew Cornford at Cricinfo
Andrew Cornford at CricketArchive

1970 births
Living people
People from Crowborough
English cricketers
Sussex Cricket Board cricketers